James Edward, Baron Hanson (20 January 1922 – 1 November 2004) was an English Conservative industrialist who built his businesses through the process of leveraged buyouts through Hanson plc.

Career
Educated at Elland Grammar School near Halifax and at the short-lived Maiden Erlegh House School at Earley, formerly the home of Solly Joel, James Hanson served as a staff officer with 7th Battalion, the Duke of Wellington's Regiment before going into the family transport business.

Lord Hanson and Gordon White (later Lord White of Hull) formed a partnership in the 1960s, and began a greetings card business. The two men also began buying other companies, in such diverse industries as fertilisers and bricks, which all sat under the umbrella of a listed entity called Hanson Trust (later renamed simply Hanson). By the 1980s, the Hanson Trust operated in both Europe and North America, purchasing under-managed businesses in sectors such as batteries, locks and safes. He was knighted in 1976 and created Baron Hanson, of Edgerton in the County of West Yorkshire, a life peerage, on 30 June 1983.

Hanson's greatest deal was the 1986 purchase of Imperial Group, a British tobacco conglomerate with a diversified portfolio of brand leaders in tobacco, brewing and food, and with a cash rich pension fund, that was his real target. Hanson's team turned up in Bristol the morning of the takeover to find the Pension Trustees had closed the Fund the evening before, denying him the asset. Lord Hanson had expected to use the Pension Fund as consideration for the transaction. However, it was funded entirely by selling many of Imperial Group's subsidiaries, leaving him with a business that made an operating-profit margin of nearly 50%.

Hanson developed a track record as a corporate raider, which ultimately worked against him in a failed bid for ICI Group, a chemical group, in 1991 which was at the time the UK's third-largest company. ICI, led by its chairman Sir Denys Henderson hired Goldman Sachs to look into Lord Hanson's business dealings, and they found that Lord Hanson's partner, White, was running racehorses at shareholders' expense. Lord Hanson had purchased 2.8% of the firm, but backed away from the takeover.

The chief characteristic of a Hanson company was that of a short-term cash-generating machine, involving large scale redundancies, and the slashing of research and development to the bone - all the hallmarks of an asset stripping operation.

Hanson was well known for his support of ex-Conservative MP Neil Hamilton, who became famous for his involvement in the "cash-for-questions affair" in the mid-1990s. He was also an active "Eurosceptic", opposed as he was to Britain joining the Euro zone, and was a founding member of Business for Britain, an anti-EU organisation. He was also a member of the Bruges Group, which advocates a substantial renegotiation of Britain's relationship with the EU, or if that is not possible, total withdrawal from the EU.

His billion-dollar empire earned Hanson the nickname "Lord Moneybags".

Personal life

Hanson dated Jean Simmons and Joan Collins and was engaged to Audrey Hepburn for almost a year, until she called off the marriage.

In 1959 Hanson married Geraldine, née Kaelin, an American divorcée. He became stepfather to her daughter, and the couple had two sons of their own, Robert (born 1960) and Brook (1964–2014).

Death 
Hanson died, aged 82, on 1 November 2004 after a long battle with cancer, at his home near Newbury, Berkshire.

Arms

References

Bibliography
 Alex Brummer and Roger Cowe, Hanson: A Biography (Fourth Estate, 1994)

External links
 Obituary, BBC News

1922 births
2004 deaths
Businesspeople from Yorkshire
People from Huddersfield
Conservative Party (UK) life peers
Corporate raiders
Deaths from cancer in England
Duke of Wellington's Regiment officers
Knights Bachelor
20th-century English businesspeople
Life peers created by Elizabeth II